The 2017 NCAA Women's Division I Swimming and Diving Championships were contested March 16–18, 2017 at the 36th annual NCAA-sanctioned swim meet to determine the team and individual national champions of Division I women's collegiate swimming and diving in the United States. 

This year's events were hosted by Indiana University – Purdue University Indianapolis at the Indiana University Natatorium in Indianapolis, Indiana.

Stanford had a dominating performance to win their first NCAA title since 1998, and their ninth overall (the most of any college swim team). They finished 160.5 points ahead of the second place performer, California.

Kathleen Baker of California was awarded the 2017 CSCAA (College Swimming Coaches Association of America) Swimmer of the Year with her wins in the 100 and 200 backstrokes, as well as an upset over favorite Ella Eastin in the 200 individual medley. She was also a part of four of Cal's relays, contributing the fastest backstroke legs on both of Cal's medley relays. She also led off the 800 free relay to a 2nd place finish, and was a part of Cal's 3rd place 400 free relay. Her leadoff in the 400 medley relay of 49.80 was an NCAA meet record, however, the relay was disqualified. 

Meanwhile, Greg Meehan of Stanford was awarded the 2017 CSCAA Division 1 Women's Coach of the Year. He led the Cardinal to a spectacular win, including individual wins from Simone Manuel, Katie Ledecky, and Ella Eastin.

Team standings
Note: Top 10 only
(H) = Hosts
(DC) = Defending champions
Italics = Debut finish in the Top 10
Full results

Swimming Results

Diving Results

See also
List of college swimming and diving teams

References

NCAA Division I Swimming And Diving Championships
NCAA Division I Swimming And Diving Championships
NCAA Division I Women's Swimming and Diving Championships